"Future Love Paradise" is a song recorded by English singer Seal. Released in 1991 as the lead track on Future Love EP, it was also included as the second single on Seal's debut album, Seal (1991). The song achieved a great success in several countries, including Switzerland, Ireland and Norway where it reached the top 10. It also hit number 12 on the UK Singles Chart. The version of the lead track on Future Love EP contains an extended vamp and breakdown which fades out later. The album version is shorter and fades out before this section takes place.

Critical reception
Pan-European magazine Music & Media wrote in their single review, that this follow-up to "Crazy" "radiates a similar mesmerising groove and (Trevor Horn-produced) sophistication." Miranda Sawyer from Smash Hits felt that this "swooping epic" is destined for Britain's Top Five, "and quite right too."

Track listings
 CD 
 "Future Love Paradise" – 5:35
 "A Minor Groove" – 5:54
 "Violet" – 2:40
 "Future Love Paradise" (reprise) – 2:27

 7" 
 "Future Love Paradise" (edit) – 4:19
 "A Minor Groove" – 5:52
 "Violet" – 2:40

 12" 
 "Future Love Paradise" – 5:31
 "A Minor Groove" – 5:52
 "Violet" – 2:40

 Future Club EP: The Nellee Hooper Remix – CD / 12"
 "Future Love Paradise" (remix) – 6:35
 "Future Love Paradise" (beats mix) – 6:08
 "Future Love Paradise" (accapella mix) – 6:00

Charts

Weekly charts

Year-end charts

Video games
According to the game files, this song was originally meant to appear on Grand Theft Auto V on the Non-Stop-Pop FM radio station.

Cultural references 
"Future Love Paradise" was featured in the POSE episode "Something Old, Something New", which premiered May 30, 2021.

References

1991 singles
Seal (musician) songs
Songs written by Seal (musician)
Song recordings produced by Trevor Horn
1990 songs
ZTT Records singles